Marmolejo is a surname. Notable people with the surname include:

Adriana Marmolejo (born 1982), Mexican swimmer
Cirilo Marmolejo (1890–1960), Mexican musician
Fran Marmolejo (born 1988), Spanish footballer
Francisco Marmolejo (born 1961), Mexican educational administrator
Libys Marmolejo (born 1992), Colombian volleyball player
Marina Marmolejo (born 1971), American judge
Ricardo Marmolejo (born 1954), Mexican swimmer
Tania Marmolejo (born 1975), American painter

See also
José Marmolejos (born 1993), Dominican baseball player